Goniophysetis is a genus of moths of the family Crambidae.

Species

References

Glaphyriinae
Crambidae genera
Taxa named by George Hampson